Kempenfelt may refer to:

 Richard Kempenfelt (1718–1782), admiral in the Royal Navy.
 Several ships of the Royal Navy named HMS Kempenfelt.
 Kempenfelt Bay, an arm of Lake Simcoe around which lies Barrie, Ontario, Canada